Chapel Road Park is a  park one mile east of Clifton in Fairfax County, Virginia.

Description
Chapel Road Park is managed by the Fairfax County Park Authority.  The adjacent area is sparsely developed due to a land-use restrictions to protect the water supply for Fairfax County.

The park is crossed by Popes Head Creek, contains a non-tidal marsh and hiking trails, and offers birding.

See also
Fairfax County Park Authority
Clifton, Virginia

References

External links 
 Chapel Road Park Invasive Removal Project

Parks in Fairfax County, Virginia